{{Speciesbox
| taxon = Conus bayeri
| image =Conus bayeri 1.jpg
| image2 =Conus bayeri 001.jpg
| image_caption =Apertural and abapertural views of shell of  Conus bayeri Petuch, E.J., 1987
| authority = Petuch, 1987
| synonyms_ref = 
| synonyms =
 Conus (Dauciconus) bayeri Petuch, 1987 · accepted, alternative representation
 Gradiconus bayeri (Petuch, 1987)
 Profundiconus bayeri (Petuch, 1987) 
| display_parents = 3
}}Conus bayeri is a species of sea snail, a marine gastropod mollusk in the family Conidae, the cone snails and their allies.

Like all species within the genus Conus, these marine snails are predatory and venomous. They are capable of "stinging" humans, therefore live ones should be handled carefully or not at all.

 Description 
Original description: "Shell small for genus, slender with low spire; body whorl smooth, with 10 incised sulci around anterior tip; shoulder sharp-angled, carinated; spire whorls slightly canaliculate; 2 small spiral sulci on body whorl just below shoulder carina; shell color white with 6 wide spiral bands made up of small, pale yellow-tan vertical lines; clear band around mid-body; anterior tip white; spiral whorls with scattered pale yellow-tan flammules; interior of aperture white; early whorls with beaded carina."

The maximum recorded shell length is 16 mm.

Distribution
Locus typicus: "Golfo de Morrosquillo, Colombia."

This species occurs in the Caribbean Sea off Panama and Colombia.

 Habitat 
Minimum recorded depth is 35 m. Maximum recorded depth is 35 m.

References

 Petuch, E. J. 1987. New Caribbean molluscan faunas.  [v] + 154 + A1-A4, 29 pls. Coastal Education & Research Foundation: Charlottesville, Virginia. 
 Tucker J.K. & Tenorio M.J. (2009) Systematic classification of Recent and fossil conoidean gastropods.'' Hackenheim: Conchbooks. 296 pp.
  Puillandre N., Duda T.F., Meyer C., Olivera B.M. & Bouchet P. (2015). One, four or 100 genera? A new classification of the cone snails. Journal of Molluscan Studies. 81: 1–23

External links
 The Conus Biodiversity website
 Cone Shells – Knights of the Sea
 

bayeri
Gastropods described in 1987